Imidazolate (C3H3N) is the conjugate base of imidazole.  It is a nucleophile and a strong base.  The free anion has C2v symmetry.  Imidazole has a pKa of 14.05, so the deprotonation of imidazole (C3H3N2H) requires a strong base.

Occurrence

Imidazolate is a common bridging ligand in coordination chemistry. In the zeolitic imidazolate frameworks, the metals are interconnected via imidazolates.  In the enzyme superoxide dismutase, imidazolate links copper and zinc centers.

References

Imidazoles
Anions